Alexandre Sidorenko defeated Nick Lindahl 6–3, 7–6(7–4) in the final.

Donald Young was the defending champion.

Seeds

Draw

Final eight

Top half

Section 1

Section 2

Bottom half

Section 3

Section 4

External links
Main Draw
Qualifying Draw

Boys' Singles
Australian Open, 2006 Boys' Singles